Selk is a municipality in the district of Schleswig-Flensburg, in Schleswig-Holstein, Germany.

References

Schleswig-Flensburg